Rajbagh is the notified area in the municipal committee of Srinagar, in the Indian union territory of Jammu and Kashmir. It comes under the Amira Kadal Constituency. Rajbagh is a posh locality in the civil line area of Srinagar. The postal code of Rajbagh is 190008. Rajbagh is considered one of the many best residential places in Srinagar. There are many hotels, restaurants and schools in this locality. Rajbagh area was heavily damaged by the 2014 Kashmir floods, it was one of the worst affected areas due to flood.

Geography
Rajbagh is situated along the river banks of Jehlum River. Ram Munshi Bagh, Shivpora, Guzarwaan Mohalla, Jawahar Nagar are the nearby localities to Rajbagh.

Subdivisions

 Pathan Bagh
 Kursoo Rajbagh
 Rajbagh Extension
 Aramwari
 Gade-henz Pora

Education
There are more than 15 schools in the area. The prestigious girls' school Presentation Convent High School is located in this area.

The area consists of following schools:
 Linton Hall School 

 Lawrence Vidya Bhawan School
 Presentation Convent High School
 Little Angles High School

September floods
The area was damaged quite heavily by the 2014 Kashmir floods. At about 4:18 AM on 7 September water started to enter the ground floors of the houses located in this locality & by 3 PM the water level had reached about 25 feet high above ground level on the streets. Some houses were fully submerged in water, others were partially submerged,  people were rescued from their houses by locals in shikaras & rafting boats. The water finally vanished in Rajbagh after 25 days. Rajbagh was submerged under water for 25 days after the flood came. The damage level was quite high in the Rajbagh area. It was one of the worst affected areas during the flood.

See also
 Lal Bazar
 Lal Chowk
 Soura
 Karan Nagar
 Indira Nagar, Srinagar

References

Neighbourhoods in Srinagar